Splashes (subtitled Tribute to Wilbur Little) is an album by saxophonist Archie Shepp's Quartet which was recorded in Holland in 1987 and released on the L+R label.

Reception

The AllMusic review by Ron Wynn said "Bluesy, aggressive, typically expressive".

Track listing
 "Arrival" (Horace Parlan) – 4:49
 "Steam" (Archie Shepp) – 10:15
 "Reflexions" (Thelonious Monk) – 6:52
 "Relaxing at Camarillo" (Charlie Parker) – 8:49
 "Manhattan" (Vernon Duke) – 10:17
 "Groovin' High" (Dizzy Gillespie) – 8:09

Personnel
Archie Shepp – tenor saxophone
Horace Parlan – piano
Harry Emmery – bass
Clifford Jarvis – drums

References

Archie Shepp albums
1987 albums
Albums produced by Wim Wigt